21st "Hamzeh" Division of Azarbaijan, based in Tabriz, East Azerbaijan Province, established as combination of the 2nd Guards Brigade and the 1st Infantry Division in Tehran, with total of four mechanized formations (including brigades of the former 1st Guards Division and Independent Guards Brigade, and 141st Infantry Battalion.

The division has participated in various operations of Iran–Iraq War, including Operation Beit ol-Moqaddas.

References

 21st "Hamzeh" Division of Azarbaijan acig.info

21st_Infantry_Division_(Iran)
Tabriz